Soushi Tajima (born 25 September 1976) is a Japanese professional golfer.

Tajima plays on the Japan Golf Tour. He has one victory on the main tour which came at the 2003 Hisamitsu-KBC Augusta.

He has also won twice on the Japan Challenge Tour.

Professional wins (3)

Japan Golf Tour wins (1)

Japan Challenge Tour wins (2)

External links

Japanese male golfers
Japan Golf Tour golfers
Sportspeople from Gunma Prefecture
1976 births
Living people